is a Japanese voice actress who was previously affiliated with Office Osawa but is now affiliated with Aoni Production . She is originally from Fukushima Prefecture.

Filmography

Anime television series
Baki the Grappler – Hanayama's Mother
Heat Guy J – Yoko Milchan
Les Misérables: Shōjo Cosette – Okami
Weiß Kreuz – Manx
Saiunkoku Monogatari – Eiki Hyou (Sa)

Video games
Sonic Adventure 2 – Secretary
Max Payne – Mona Sax
Tales of Phantasia (PSP version) – Luce Klaine
Tales of Rebirth – Rakia
Tales of the Abyss – Suzanne
Valkyrie Profile 2: Silmeria – Roussalier

CD drama
Itazura na Kiss – Noriko Irie

Dubbing

Live-action
Bill & Ted's Bogus Journey (1994 TV Tokyo edition), Missy (Amy Stock-Poynton)
Blue Steel (1993 Fuji TV edition), Tracy (Elizabeth Peña)
Charlie and the Chocolate Factory (2008 NTV edition), Mrs. Gloop (Franziska Troegner)
Con Air, Sally Bishop (Rachel Ticotin)
Dragonfly, Miriam Belmont (Kathy Bates)
ER, Carla Reece (Lisa Nicole Carson)
First Sunday, Sister Doris (Loretta Devine)
Gentlemen Broncos, Judith Purvis (Jennifer Coolidge)
Glitter, Kelly (Ann Magnuson)
The Godfather Saga, Kay Adams-Corleone (Diane Keaton)
Harry Potter and the Order of the Phoenix, Madam Mafalda Hopkirk (Jessica Hynes)
Hide and Seek, Allison Callaway (Amy Irving)
I Feel Pretty, Vivian (Aidy Bryant)
Life as We Know It, DeeDee (Melissa McCarthy)
Mortal Engines, Mrs. Wreyland (Megan Edwards)
Once Upon a Time, Granny (Beverley Elliott)
Paddington, Aunt Lucy (Imelda Staunton)
Paddington 2, Aunt Lucy (Imelda Staunton)
Patti Cake$, Barb (Bridget Everett)
Peter Rabbit, Mrs. Tiggy-Winkle
Peter Rabbit 2: The Runaway, Mrs. Tiggy-Winkle
The Poseidon Adventure, Belle Rosen (Shelley Winters)
Spy, Susan Cooper (Melissa McCarthy)
Twin Peaks, Jocelyn "Josie" Packard (Joan Chen)
Ultraman: The Ultimate Hero, Police Woman/Officer Callahan (Mari Weiss)

Animation
The Adventures of Tintin (Bianca Castafiore)
The Angry Birds Movie (Monica)
Arthur Christmas (North Pole Computer)
Cars 2 (Minny)
My Little Pony: Friendship Is Magic (Mayor Mare)
Rango (Bonnie)
Tayo the Little Bus (Poco) (Season 1 onwards)
The Little Mermaid II: Return to the Sea (Carlotta)
Turning Red (Ping)
Wreck-It Ralph (Mary)

References

External links

1960 births
Living people
Voice actresses from Fukushima Prefecture
Japanese video game actresses
Japanese voice actresses
20th-century Japanese actresses
21st-century Japanese actresses